Aida Girma-Melaku, born in Ethiopia and a naturalized citizen  of Italy, is a writer and the representative of UNICEF in Pakistan.

Life
Girma-Melaku was born in Ethiopia and became a citizen of Italy. Girma-Melaku was educated at Southern New Hampshire University, where she obtained an M.Sc. in Development Economics after a B.Sc. in International Development. She also took a course at Harvard. Girma-Melaku was a UNICEF representative for fourteen years in Uganda, South Africa and Malawi. She remained associated with UNICEF as Deputy Representative of UNICEF in Mozambique and Somalia.

On 12 April 2018 she presented her credentials to Khawaja Muhammad Asif, the Foreign Minister of Pakistan, as the new UNICEF representative.

Contributions
Girma-Melaku speaks on different welfare projects and writes articles to highlight women's problems.

References

UNICEF
Harvard University
Southern New Hampshire University
Ethiopian people
Ethiopian emigrants to Italy
Living people
Year of birth missing (living people)